Weinerville is an American television program on Nickelodeon that was aired from July 11, 1993 to 1994. The show was based around a giant puppet stage that was designed to look like a city called Weinerville. The show was created and hosted by Marc Weiner.

Production
In the show's first season, all episodes ran in a two-hour marathon every Sunday. However, Weinerville quickly gained popularity; in the middle of the first season, November 15, 1993, Nickelodeon began running the show on weekday afternoons. As a result, Nickelodeon allowed Marc and his characters to host a New Year's special event, a kids' version of Dick Clark's New Year's Rockin' Eve titled Nick New Year's, with host segments serving as wraparounds for the best Nicktoons and shows of that year, and read letters from kids about their New Year's resolutions as they counted down to midnight, then celebrated by shooting slime into the sky. Marc and his Weinerville characters hosted Nick New Year's in 1993 and 1994.
  
For the 40-episode second season, premiered on March 21, 1994, the episodes aired daily and were later part of the Stick Stickly show Nick in the Afternoon, which included Marc as Dottie in some segments. Unfortunately with all the success of hosting two seasons, three television specials, and especially hitting a milestone for being the show to tape its 1000th episode at Nickelodeon Studios, Weinerville was not renewed for a third season. According to Marc, the cancellation happened because Nickelodeon was changing their identity from family friendly to edgy, sarcastic, and somewhat subversive shows, and a puppet show did not fit with the network's new direction of programming.

Overview
Nickelodeon Weinerville was filmed at Nickelodeon Studios at Universal Studios Florida. It was an audience participation comedy show focused on Weiner and his puppets and about them making a show. The first few episodes did not have much of a plot or story line. Starting in the latter part of the first season, the show started to integrate storylines and plots. Weinerville also had three television specials.

Following the first segment and a prelude to "Playland," the viewers would watch cartoons of Mr. Magoo, Honey Halfwitch, The Alvin Show, Gerald McBoing-Boing and Batfink.

Characters

Human characters
 Marc Weiner - The host of Weinerville who is always forced to solve most of Dottie's or the town's problems. In season one, Marc wears an unbuttoned Weinerville baseball jersey with a green undershirt. In season two, the color of his undershirt changes.
 Kevin Elemeno P. (pronounced: "L-M-N-O-P") - The "Network Executive" character, played by Orlando local child actor Travis Robertson (played young Kevin O'Shea in the movie Little Giants), is a pun on the name of the real executive producer of the program, current MTV Networks executive Kevin Kay. Made three appearances (only in season 2).

Puppets
The puppets below feature Weiner's head and a puppet body where their parts have been pre-taped so that Weiner can interact with them:

 Dottie - The Mayor of Weinerville. Marc is usually forced to solve Dottie's problems and tends to get carried away with things if they don't get out of control. She has a sidekick/assistant named Zip. Dottie always quotes "Oh well, Welcome to Weinerville" at the end of the cold opening.
 Baby Jeffrey - The puppet nephew of Marc. He would usually introduce Marc at the beginning of each episode and always makes a mess.
 Big Pops - The owner of the diner Pops'. Big Pops usually does a lot with his nose, either picking it or playing the kazoo. On some occasions, Big Pops only appeared in Season One.
 Schnitzel - Marc's sassy parrot sidekick. He only appeared in Season One. While Schnitzel was usually played by Marc, there would be an unnamed extra playing him when Marc was in front of the audience.
 Commander Ozone - A space captain that runs the AV-1 Spaceship. He defends evil and saves the universe with his sidekick Wilson. In Season 1, he was renamed to "Captain Ozone".
 Eric Von Firstensecond - Commander Ozone's evil enemy. He always tries to figure out an evil scheme to take over Weinerville or to marry Dottie. Eric only appeared in Season 2.
 Cocktail Frank - The bandleader and guitar player of the house band of the show "Cocktail Frank And His Weenies." Frank is the lead singer/guitarist where his puppet band consisted of Posse on piano/turntables, Antoinette on drums, an unnamed bass guitarist, and an unnamed saxophone player.
 Joey Deluxe - The big shot manager and super entertainment agent.
 Soup Tureen - The host of That's Not Fair who only appeared in Season 2.

The ones listed below are puppet characters:

 Zip (performed by Scott Fellows) - Dottie's assistant who always gets himself into trouble, makes his famous trademark scream, and crashes into the wall. In "DTV", it is revealed that Zip is good friends with Boney.
 Boney (performed by Marc Weiner) - An obvious parody of Barney, he is a dinosaur skeleton in sneakers that lives in the jungles of Weinerville. Boney is beloved by children, but hates them himself. When Boney quotes "Now get outta here," the children and anyone else visiting him that are present leave his cave. The "theme song" at the end of his show consisted of said puppet singing "I'm Boney, I'm Boney, leave me aloney!" For Season 2, Boney's puppet was rebuilt which that version also being used for the specials. In the "Chanukah Special," it is revealed that Boney loves to eat potato pancakes. He was also shown to have been attracted by the Weinerville Ski Lodge's new housekeeper Miss Kabobble (who dislikes it when someone gets snow on the floor and she ends up vacuuming it). According to the 1995 summer issue of Nickelodeon Magazine, Boney is Weiner's favorite puppet.
 Pops (performed by Ray Abruzzo) - Known in season one as "Little Pops". He is the local chef who works with Big Pops. After Big Pops was dropped from the show, Pops took over the restaurant. He sometimes starts arguing with Louie, but they tend to get along.
 Louie (performed by Scott Fellows) - The local laundromat owner who always argues with Pops, but they tend to get along.
 Socko (performed by Marc Weiner) - An inverted hand puppet who likes to kick Marc's buttocks, performed with his own props, and made sarcastic gestures when things did not go right.
 Wilson - The sidekick of Commander Ozone. In Season One, he had a squeaky voice like Zip. In Season Two, he sounds like Scotty of Star Trek fame.
 Professor Phosphate (performed by Scott Fellows and David Jordan) - A puppet scientist with green hair who can only be seen from the waist up who debuted in Season 2. Professor Phosphate is the owner of Weinerville Labs and often causes explosions with some inventions that don't work well. Despite this, he often solves the problems.
 Fufusky - A grub-like alien who is Eric von Firstensecond's alien sidekick. He stuns people using his breathe ray (silly string).
 Berny - He is responsible for bringing out the Weinerizer being pulled by his tractor.

Other sketches
The show also featured several non-puppet characters played by Weiner himself:

 Captain Bob - Captain Bob is a sea captain in yellow rain gear that constantly cracks puns. He owns the S.S. Bob at Port Weinerville (which is located near the building where Cocktail Frank and His Wienies are located). On many shows, an audience member would be invited to climb aboard where an offscreen person would fling water on him before the "tidal wave" (a bucket of water, or, in some cases, slime, thrown by a stage hand) soaked the participant. Captain Bob first appeared on Saturday Night Live when Weiner was a writer in the early 1980s. In scenes in which Marc Weiner interacts with Captain Bob, an actor seen from behind would portray Captain Bob with Weiner dubbing his voice in during post-production.
 The Weinerville General Store - Members of the audience were also called down to participate in various activities during the main part of the show, such as helping to demonstrate items in the Weinerville General Store. A recurring joke on the show took place in the General Store in which Weiner would sell comedic props similar to those of Carrot Top. Nearly everything in the store sold for $13.50. It only appeared in Season One.
 Running Joke - Occasionally, the "$13.50" gag was used in other segments. For example: on the "Talent Show" episode the winners won with 1,350 points. On the "DTV" episode, DTV was on channel 1350. On the General Store and Captain Bob skits, that would be the price when Marc would hand the participant anything. The “13.50” gag was an inside joke that head writer Ray Abruzzo and Marc joked about before the show and they just thought it was funny so they just put it in the show.
 That's Not Fair! - A game show where a kid and an adult played for points answering questions. Usually the kids win. It was only featured in Season 2. According to an interview with Marc Weiner, "That's Not Fair" was a pilot he made for Comedy Central in 1991, after it was tested, the network said it was appropriate for children, so Nickelodeon got a hold of it and the pilot became "Weinerville".
 Weinerizer — The show always ended with Weiner choosing two people from the audience to get "Weinerized" (turned into puppets). The participants entered a contraption called the Weinerizer upon being helped by two crew members. The Weinerizer appeared to then shrink them to the puppet size (it did so by having the contestants place their heads into a hole above a miniature puppet body). Although the audience members were ostensibly chosen at random, Matt Day (who at the time was working on another Nickelodeon show Clarissa Explains It All) revealed that participants were sometimes selected beforehand. Including him, he was on the “Baseball” Episode in Playland. They would compete in a game and the winner would receive "The Golden Hot Dog", as well as a dose of green slime. During the credits, the two people would be seen being let out of the Weinerizer.
 Playland - In the prelude to this sketch, Weiner would call upon two audience members to come forth to be placed in the Weinerizer so that they can be sent to Playland. In Season Two, an alarm would go off to let Weiner know that it is almost time for Playland. These participants then competed in one of various games in Playland that tested the skill of operating their puppet bodies. The runner-up received the "Silver Hot Dog", with the winner receiving the "Golden Hot Dog" as well as the "Special Topping" (a small amount of green slime dumped onto the player's head). If a malfunction occurred or both players tied they both get the "Golden Hot Dog". Occasionally, both players received the Special Topping, especially when both players were adults, and if the game involved pies, both contestants would be hit with pies themselves instead of anyone getting the Special Topping (however, the special topping was awarded for pie games in season 2). The Playland stage was enlarged and revamped the second season to incorporate more elaborate stunts; these frequently had the contestants facing each other and squirting water or whipped cream at some target, usually soaking the other contestant in the process. Some season 2 stunts were team stunts where each player had a non-Weinerized teammate. Season one was a carnival-style. In the second season, it was a radio-active style.

Episodes
All episodes aired out of sequence in no particular order. The show had a total of 68 episodes by February 1994, and the last episode was the 1000th television episode broadcast in Nickelodeon's history. The production schedule for the second season was November 29, 1993 to February 14, 1994.

Season 1 (1993)

Season 2 (1994)

{| class="wikitable"
|-
|32|| Weinerville For Sale || Donald Rump (parody of Donald Trump) is trying to buy out Weinerville to make room for a burger joints and casino. Dottie and Marc do their best with not letting this happen, or Marc will be replaced by a guy named Bob Burger. ||
|-
|33|| Eric Von Firstenseconds' Spell || Eric Von Firstensecond is plotting to take over Weinerville by taking over the citizen's minds! All but Marc and Commander Ozone are unaffected because then the show wouldn't have an ending. 
|-
|34|| 60 Seconds News ||  Episode has not surfaced yet.
|-
|35|| Fire Safety || Marc and the Weinerville characters teach us how dangerous fire is and how to prevent fires from starting. || 
|-
|36|| Magic Lamp ||  Invents the West & (unknown Alvin Show segment)
|-
|37|| The Puppet's Court || Pop's and Louie's arguments have got out of control until finally Marc has an idea to settle their latest dispute in the puppet's court with Dottie being the judge, the case was if Pops burnt Louie's lunch, but she find's both guilty of being "pains in the butt". || 
|-
|38|| Broken Weinerizer || The Weinerizer is broken. Marc, being a proud "do-it-yourself" guy, offers his best to fix it. He eventually does in the last minute. Zip was helping him and he gets stuck until the end of the show where he grows into human size then falls out the side of the machine. || 
|-
|39|| Network Censors || Episode has not surfaced as of yet. || 
|-
|40|| Louie Becomes a Citizen || Louie, after waiting many years for his papers gets to become a citizen of Weinerville! So the gang throws him a party! || 
|-
|41|| Louie's Crush || Louie has a crush on Dottie! || Alvin's Cruise (1962) & Magoo's Glorious Fourth (1957)
|-
|42|| Dottie's Cousin || Dottie goes on vacation and has her cousin fill in for her who happens to boss around the Weinerville gang like a drill sergeant. || 
|-
|43|| Brain Switch || Dottie and Commander Ozone switch bodies in a Freaky Friday sort of way! || 
|-
|44|| Parallel Universe || Commander Ozone and Wilson are entering coordinates to visit Weinerville. However, Wilson let his hair grow little to big that he reads the coordinates backwards. They enter a parallel Weinerville, a world just like Weinerville but backwards, even roles are reversed like Zip being the Mayor of Weinerville. Professor Phosphate works to bring them home. || 
|-
|45|| Boney's Spell || Professor Phosphate's invention goes wrong and it releases a toxic gas that makes everyone in Puppet City act like Boney.|| 
|-
|46|| The Time-Slot War || Dottie got wind of the network wanting a show to air before "Weinerville". but news travels fast that everyone in Puppet City has a show idea, things get out of hand. || 
|-
|47|| Dottie's High School Reunion || Dottie has been invited to her high school reunion. Not particularly excited, she invites Socko as her date and makes a great impression. || 
|-
|48|| Loca Cola || Dottie is addicted to the "Loca Cola" soda and learns a lesson on when to say "no". || 
|-
|49|| Weinervilla || Weinerville is being sued by a Spanish show called "Weinervilla" claiming "Weinerville" stole their idea. || Ostrich (1961) & Mexico-the Brave Chipmunks (1961)
|-
|50|| Ego Crazy || Everybody in Weinerville has there ego's out of control, even Boney is threatening to quit unless he gets "Barney" money. So Marc calls upon Kevin Elemeno P. to come and be the voice of reason. However, Kevin runs the Weinerizer and Playland and his ego gets out of control. || Polly Wolly Doodle (1961) & Theodore's Dog (1961)
|-
|51|| No Time || Marc has so much to do, but Dottie forces him to do her shopping, as she needs to make a report for the network executive, Kevin. Marc eventually comes back, and Dottie faxes the report and keeps Kevin from shutting the show down.|| 
|-
|52|| Variety Show or Sitcom || Dottie and Marc disagree on what the show is, but finally come to an agreement after turning the show into a sitcom (I Love Lucy parody, with Marc playing the husband). Then the second half was a variety show with dancers, and even a song "Welcome to Weinerville" || 
|-
|53|| DTV || Mayor Dottie abandons her role as the Mayor of Weinerville and starts her own public access fly-by-night cable network. On one of her projects, she interviews Melissa Joan Hart and the cast of Clarissa Explains It All. || While Strolling in the Park (1961) & This is Your Life, Clyde Crashcup! (1961)
|-
|54|| Socko Framed || Episode has not surfaced  yet. || 
|-
|55|| Royal Dottie || Episode has not surfaced  yet. || 
|-
|56|| Zip Runs Away || Zip and Dottie get into an argument and quits his job and leaves Weinerville, so he tries to work for Commander Ozone. Things don't workout for Zip so he decides to go back home, unfortunately Zip gets stuck in Ozone's tracker beam, he eventually breaks free then in a Wizard of Oz-type of way, Zip encounters a "fairy godmother" who looks exactly like Louie, however its Doctor Biscuit, and explains he has the power to wish himself back home. Zip makes it back home by saying, "There's no place Like Weinerville". || 
|-
|57|| Dottie's Dating Game || Dottie gets a love letter from an old flame that lives in Alaska. She leaves over night, not knowing that Marc planned a Dating Game for Dottie (The Dating Game Parody, none of the three bachelor's can not see Dottie. The bachelors are played by Ray Abruzzo as a hunky bad boy, Scott Fellows as a nice clean cut guy, and Brian Berns as a filthy slob). With Dottie being gone, Marc provides the voice for her. Meanwhile, Dottie learning that the flame of hers is seeing someone else, she storms back home. However, she isn't back before she is supposed to choose who she wants to date, so Marc chooses the nice guy. Dottie comes back and chooses the good-looking bad boy. || 
|-
|58|| Weinerville: The Movie || Marc is directing and working on casting for a motion picture based on Weinerville which actors and actresses try out for their roles. || 
|-
|59|| Marc's Lost Memory || Marc hits his head and loses his memory after Mayor Dottie tells him that the head of the network Clara Cloud is coming. Now Mayor Dottie, Zip, Pops, Louie, Socko, and Professor Phosphate must find a way to restore Marc's memory. || 
|-
|60|| Back to the Past from a Look into the Future || Professor Phosphate creates a device that can look through the future and the past. || 
|-
|61|| Pollution || Eric von Firstensecond uses Weinerville as his landfill area. While Marc works on a way to clean up the mess, Zip becomes Eco Man to combat Eric von Firstensecond. || Polly Wolly Doodle (1961) & Theodore's Dog (1961)
|-
|62|| XR-3 Space Shuttle Game || Dottie invents a new video game that becomes a success. The evil Eric von Firstensecond sees how much money she made. He wants to marry her and she says no. So he takes matters into his own hands. Marc, Socko, Captain Ozonem and even Wilson get kidnapped and trapped from Fufusky's evil poison string (Silly String). Luckily, Captain Ozone has a harmonica he was playing in jail, that also transmits to Professor Phosphate. Professor Phosphate works out a devise in Playland to free Marc and the crew. Boney runs the Weinerizer and Playland. Finally, Firstensecond is trapped in the video game getting smacked with meteors by Socko who enjoys playing the video game. || 
|-
|63||  || || 
|-
|64||  || || 
|-
|65||  || || 
|-
|66||  || || 
|-
|67||  || || 
|-
|68||  || || 
|}

Specials

Guest stars
 Marc Summers of Family Double Dare is referenced regularly, made a cameo on the "Giant Spider" episode, as well as in the Chanukah, New Year's, and Election Specials.
 Pro Wrestler Kevin Nash on the "Chanukah Special"
 Phil Moore of Nick Arcade on the "Variety Show or Sitcom" episode
 Dr. Joyce Brothers on the "XR-3 Space Shuttle Game" episode
 Denny Dillon on the "Chanukah Special".
 Buster Poindexter on the "Chanukah Special".
 Moira Quirk of Nickelodeon GUTS, on the "Variety Show or Sitcom" episode
 Huey Lewis
 The cast of Clarissa Explains It All on the "DTV" episode
(not all interviews were shown, Sean O'Neal and Jason Zimbler were just quickly glimpsed) 
 Melissa Joan Hart on the New Year's, and Election special, and on the "DTV" episode
 Vlade Divac on the "International Relations and the IMF" episode
 Mike Maronna of The Adventures of Pete & Pete'' made a cameo on the New Year's special
 Paul Shaffer made a cameo on the New Year's special
 Bill Maher on the Election Special
 John Tesh and Mary Hart on the Election Special
 Leeza Gibbons on the Election Special
 Pat O'Brien on the Election Special
 Joe Lieberman on the Election Special
 Andy Lawrence

References

External links
 

1990s American children's comedy television series
American television series with live action and animation
American television shows featuring puppetry
1990s Nickelodeon original programming
1993 American television series debuts
1994 American television series endings
Paramount Global franchises